Michael Spyres is an American operatic baritenor. He is particularly associated with the bel canto repertoire, especially the works of Rossini, and heroic roles in French grand opera.

Biography

Michael Spyres was born in 1979 in Missouri, US, and studied singing at the University of Music and Performing Arts Vienna, Austria. He won acclaim and international recognition for his performance in the title role of Rossini's Otello at the Rossini in Wildbad festival in Germany in 2008. He made his debut at La Scala, Milan, in Rossini's Il viaggio a Reims in 2009  and appeared the same year in the extremely demanding leading role of Raoul in Meyerbeer's Les Huguenots at Bard SummerScape in New York. Since then, his career has taken him to the Royal Opera House, London, in the title role of Mozart's Mitridate, Re di Ponto, to the Teatro Comunale, Bologna and La Monnaie, Brussels as Arnold in Rossini's Guillaume Tell., to Opéra National de Bordeaux for the title role in Berlioz' La Damnation de Faust and to the Liceu, Barcelona, in the title role of Jacques Offenbach's Les Contes d'Hoffmann, among many other engagements both in concerts and staged operas. Spyres won widespread praise for his performance of the role of Vasco da Gama in Meyerbeer's L'Africaine at the Oper Frankfurt in 2018. He sang the title role in a new production of Adolphe Adam's Le postillon de Lonjumeau at the Opéra-Comique in Paris in March 2019. Spyres made his debut at the Metropolitan Opera, New York, in the title role of La damnation de Faust in 2020.

His many recordings include Berlioz's Les Troyens (title role of Énée), Requiem, Les nuits d’été, La damnation de Faust, Rossini's Otello, Guillaume Tell and Le siège de Corinthe for Naxos Records, Les Huguenots for American Symphony Orchestra and the solo album Espoir for Opera Rara.

Michael Spyres is the artistic director of Springfield Regional Opera, US.

References

Selected recordings

Complete Operas 
 George Handel, Il Trionfo del Tempo e del Disinganno, HWV46a, Sabine Devieilhe (Bellezza), Franco Fagioli (Piacere), Sara Mingardo (Disinganno), Michael Spyres (Tempo) with the participation of Christine Angot, Le Concert d’Astrée, Emmanuelle Haïm (conductor) & Krzysztof Warlikowski (stage director)
 George Handel, Theodora, Lisette Oropesa (Theodora), Joyce DiDonato (Irene), Paul-Antoine Bénos-Djian (Didymus), Michael Spyres (Septimius), John Chest (Valens), Il Pomo d'Oro, Maxim Emelyanychev
 Wolfgang Amadeus Mozart, Mitridate, re di Ponto, Michael Spyres (Mitridate), Julie Fuchs (Aspasia), Sabine Devieilhe (Ismène), Elsa Dreisig (Sifare), Paul-Antoine Bénos-Djian (Farnace), Adriana Bignagni Lesca (Arbate), Cyrille Dubois (Marzio), Les Musiciens du Louvre, Marc Minkowski
 Gaetano Donizetti, Les Martyrs, Michael Spyres (Polyeucte), Joyce El-Khoury (Pauline), David Kempster (Sévère), Brindley Sherratt (Félix), Clive Bayley (Callisthènes), Wynne Evans (Néarque), Orchestra of the Age of Enlightenment, Sir Mark Elder
 Gaetano Donizetti, Le Duc d'Albe, Michael Spyres, Henri de Bruges, Angela Meade, Hélène d'Egmont, Laurent Naouri, Le Duc d'Albe, Sandoval, David Stout, Opera para Chorus, Hallé Orchestra, conducted by Sir Mark Elder. 2 CD Opera rara 2015
Gioachino Rossini, Guillaume Tell, Andrew Foster-Williams (Tell), Alessandra Volpe (Hedwige), Judith Howarth (Mathilde), Michael Spyres (Arnold), Tara Stafford (Jemmy), Giulio Pelligra (Rodolphe), Artavazd Sargsyan (Ruodi), Nahuel Di Pierro (Walther Fürst/Melchthal), Raffaele Facciolà (Gesler), Marco Filippo Romano (Leuthold)
Gioachino Rossini, La Gazzetta, Marco Cristarella Orestano (Don Pomponio Storion), Judith Gauthier (Lisetta), Giulio Mastrototaro (Filippo), Vincenzo Bruzzaniti (Don Anselmo), Rossella Bevacqua (Doralice), Michael Spyres (Alberto), Maria Soulis (Madama La Rose), Filippo Polinelli (Monsù Traversen) & Ugo Mahieux (harpsichord)
Gioachino Rossini, Otello, Michael Spyres (tenor), Jessica Pratt (soprano), Ugo Guagliardo (bass), Giorgio Trucco (tenor), Geraldine Chauvet (mezzo-soprano) & Leonardo Cortellazzi (tenor), Virtuosi Brunensis & Transylvania State Philharmonic Choir, Cluj, Antonino Fogliani
Gioachino Rossini, Le Siege de Corinthe, Lorenzo Regazzo (bass), Majella Cullagh (soprano), Marc Sala (tenor), Michael Spyres (tenor), Matthieu Lécroart (bass), Gustavo Quaresma Ramos (tenor), Marco Filippo Romano (baritone) & Silvia Beltrami (mezzo-soprano), Camerata Bach Choir, Poznań & Virtuosi Brunensis, Jean-Luc Tingaud
Adolphe Adam, Le Postillon de Lonjumeau, Michael Spyres (Chapelou/Saint-Phar), Florie Valiquette (Madeleine/Madame de Latour), Franck Leguerinel (Le Marquis de Corcy), Laurent Kubla (Biju/Alcindor), Michel Fau (Rose), Yannis Ezziadi (Louis XV), Julien Clement (Bourdon), Accentus, Orchestre de l'Opera de Rouen Normandie, Sebastien Rouland
Ferdinand Hérold, Le Pré Aux Clercs, Marie-Ève Munger, Marie Lenormand, Jeanne Crousaud, Michael Spyres, Éric Huchet & Christian Helmer, Coro e Orquestra Gulbenkian, Paul McChreesh
Hector Berlioz, Les Troyens, Joyce DiDonato- Didon, Marie-Nicole Lemieux- Cassandre, Stéphane Degout- Chorèbe, Michael Spyres- Enée, Cyrille Dubois- Iopas, Mariane Crebassa- Ascagne, Nicolas Courjal- Narbal, Les Chœurs de l'Opéra National du Rhin, Badischer Staatsopernchor, Orchestre Philharmonique de Strasbourg, conducted by John Nelson. 4 CD + 1 DVD Warner 2017. Diapason d'or, Choc de Classica.
 Hector Berlioz, Requiem, Michael Spyres, ténor, London Philharmonic Choir,, Philharmonia Chorus, Philharmonia Orchestra, conducted by John Nelson. 2 CD + 1 DVD Erato 2019. Choc de Classica.
 Hector Berlioz, La Damnation de Faust, Michael Spyres- Faust, Joyce DiDonato- Marguerite, Nicolas Courjal- Méphistophélès, Alexandre Duhamel- Brander, Les Petits Chanteurs de Strasbourg, Maîtrise de l'Opéra National du Rhin, Orchestre Philharmonique de Strasbourg, conducted by John Nelson. 2 CD + 1 DVD Warner classics 2019. Diapason d'or.
 Hector Berlioz, Benvenuto Cellini, Michael Spyres, Benvenuto Cellini, Sophia Burgos, Teresa, Maurizio Murano, Balducci, Adèle Charvet, Ascanio, Lionel Lhote, Fieramosca, Tareq Nazmi, le pape Clément, Monteverdi Choir, Orchestre Révolutionnaire et Romantique, directing Noa Naamat, conducted by John Eliot Gardiner. 1 DVD Château de Versailles spectacles 2019
Hector Berlioz, Benvenuto Cellini, Michael Spyres (Benvenuto Cellini), Sophia Burgos (Teresa), Maurizio Muraro (Balducci), Adèle Charvet (Ascanio), Lionel Lhote (Fieramosca), Tareq Nazmi (Pope Clement VII), Vincent Delhoume (Francesco), Orchestre Révolutionnaire et Romantique, Monteverdi Choir, Sir John Eliot Gardiner. DVD Château de Versailles Spectacles  2020
Charles Gounod, La Nonne sanglante, Laurence Equilbey, Conductor, Insula Orchestra, Choeur Accentus, Michael Spyres (Rodolphe), Marion Lebeque (La nonne sanglante), Vannina Santoni, (Agnès), Jérôme Boutillier (Le Comte), Jodi Devos (Arthur), Jean Teitgen (Pierre L'Ermite), Luc Bertin-Hugault (Le baron), Enquerrand De Hys (Fritz), stage Director David Bobée. DVD or Blu-ray Naxos 2019.
Giacomo Meyerbeer, Les Huguenots, Andrew Schroeder (Count de Nevers), Michael Spyres (Raoul de Nagis), Peter Volpe (Marcel), Marie Lenormand (Urbain), Erin Morley (Marguerite de Valois), John Marcus Bindel (Count de Saint-Bris), Alexandra Deshorties (Valentine), American Symphony Orchestra, Leon Botstein
Mazzoni: Antigono, Michael Spyres (Antigono), Geraldine McGreevy (Berenice), Pamela Lucciarini (Demetrio), Ana Quintans (Ismene), Maria Hinojosa Montenegro (Clearco), Martin Oro (Alessandro), Orchestra Divino Sospiro, Enrico Onofri
Mayr: Medea in Corinto, Roberto Lorenzi (Creonte), Mihaela Marcu (Creusa), Paolo Cauteruccio (Evandro), Michael Spyres (Giasone), Marco Stefani (Tideo), Davinia Rodriguez (Medea), Nozomi Kato (Ismene), Enea Scala (Egeo), Orchestra Internazionale d'Italia, Corul Filarmonicii de Stat Transilvania, Fabio Luisi

Orchestral Works 
Robert Schumann: Scenes from Goethe's 'Faust''', American Symphony Orchestra, Twyla Robinson, Andrew Schroeder, Kyle Ketelsen, Concert Chorale of New York, Michael Spyres, Matt Boehler, Leon Botstein
 Hector Berlioz, Les Nuits d'été, Michael Spyres (baritenor), Timothy Ridout (viola), Orchestre philharmonique de Strasbourg, John Nelson
Gioachino Rossini Messa di Gloria, Eleonora Buratto (soprano), Teresa Iervolino (contralto), Lawrence Brownlee (tenor), Michael Spyres (tenor), Carlo Lepore (bass), Orchestra dell'Accademia Nazionale di Santa Cecilia, Coro dell'Accademia Nazionale di Santa Cecilia, Antonio Pappano
 Maurice Ravel, Canates Pour Le Prix de Rome, Véronique Gens (soprano), Vannina Santoni (sopranos), Sophie Koch, Janina Baechle (mezzos), Julien Behr, Michael Spyres (tenors), Jacques Imbrailo (baritone), Choeur et Orchestre National des Pays de La Loire, Pascal Rophé
 Felix Mendelssohn, Symphonies & Overtures, Lucy Crowe (soprano), Jurgita Adamonytė (mezzo), Michael Spyres (tenor), Alexander Knox (Puck), Ceri-lyn Cissone (Titania), Frankie Wakefield (Oberon), Maria Joao Pires (piano), London Symphony Orchestra, The Monteverdi Choir, Sir John Eliot Gardiner
 Antonin Dvorak, Stabat Mater, Op. 58, Eri Nakamura (soprano), Elisabeth Kulman (contralto), Michael Spyres (tenor), Jongmin Park (bass), Czech Philharmonic Orchestra, Prague Philharmonic Choir, Jiří Bělohlávek

 Recitals Baritenor Michael Spyres (baritenor), Orchestre Philharmonique de Strasbourg, Marko Letonja
 Gioachino Rossini: Amici e Rivali, Michael Spyres (tenor), Lawrence Brownlee (tenor), I Virtuosi Italiani, Corrado RovarisEspoir, Michael Spyres (tenor), Joyce El-Khoury (soprano), The Hallé, Carlo Rizzi
 A Fool For Love'', Michael Spyres (tenor), Moscow Chamber Orchestra, Constantine Orbelian

External links
Official website

1979 births
Living people
American operatic tenors
Singers from Missouri
21st-century American opera singers
21st-century American male singers
21st-century American singers
University of Music and Performing Arts Vienna alumni